William Joseph Scherrer (born January 20, 1958), is a former professional baseball player who pitched in the Major Leagues primarily as a relief pitcher from 1982–1988. He was born in the Town of Tonawanda, New York, and graduated from Cardinal O'Hara High School there in 1976. After retirement, he moved to Grand Island, New York.

In 1984, Scherrer won his first World Series Championship as a player with the Detroit Tigers.
In 1997, he won his second World Series Championship as a scout for the Florida Marlins.
And in 2005, Scherrer won his third World Series Championship as a scout and special assistant to the general manager, Kenny Williams, for the Chicago White Sox.

On October 26, 2006, Scherrer was inducted into the Greater Buffalo Sports Hall of Fame. Other inductees included fan favorites Bill Hurley, Bruce Smith, and Dave Andreychuk.

References

External links

, or Retrosheet, or Pura Pelota (Venezuelan Winter League)

1958 births
Living people
American expatriate baseball players in Mexico
Baltimore Orioles players
Baseball players from New York (state)
Chicago White Sox scouts
Cincinnati Reds players
Cincinnati Reds scouts
Detroit Tigers players
Eugene Emeralds players
Indianapolis Indians players
Iowa Cubs players
Maine Phillies players
Major League Baseball pitchers
Mexican League baseball pitchers
Miami Marlins scouts
Nashville Sounds players
Oklahoma City 89ers players
People from Tonawanda, New York
Philadelphia Phillies players
Phoenix Firebirds players
Rochester Red Wings players
Shelby Reds players
Tampa Tarpons (1957–1987) players
Tecolotes de los Dos Laredos players
Tidewater Tides players
Tigres de Aragua players
American expatriate baseball players in Venezuela
Waterbury Reds players
Wichita Aeros players